Plionoma basalis is a species of beetle in the family Cerambycidae. It was described by Horn in 1894.

References

Trachyderini
Beetles described in 1894
Taxa named by George Henry Horn